Gilbert Teodoro
 Gibo (anime)
 Board game record